Good Vibrations is a Broadway jukebox musical conceived and directed by  John Carrafa featuring the music of Brian Wilson and The Beach Boys.  It opened February 2, 2005, at the Eugene O'Neill Theatre and ran for 94 performances before closing on April 24, 2005. The musical follows the tale of three high school friends who want to escape their small New England town and drive to California.  However, none of them own a car, so they invite the unpopular valedictorian girl who has a crush on one of the guys to use her for her car, and drama and romance ensue. The cast on opening night starred Kate Reinders as Caroline, David Larsen as Bobby, Tituss Burgess as Eddie, Brandon Wardell as Dave, Jessica-Snow Wilson as Marcella, David Reiser as Dean and Sebastian Arcelus as Jan.  Janet Dacal, Sarah Glendening and  Krysta Rodriguez made their Broadway debuts in the show.

Musical numbers
Act one
"Our Prayer" – Surfer Guys
"Fun, Fun, Fun" – Bobby and Company
"Keep an Eye on Summer" – Surfer Guys
"Wouldn't It Be Nice" – Eddie, Marcella and Surfer Guys
"In My Room" – Caroline, Marcella and High School Kids
"I Get Around" – Dave, Bobby, Eddie and Surfer Guys
"When I Grow Up (To Be a Man)" – Caroline, Bobby, Dave, Eddie, Marcella and High School Kids
"Break Away" – Bobby, Dave, Eddie and Surfer Guys
"Don't Worry, Baby" – Caroline, Bobby and High School Kids
"Surf City" – Dave, Bobby, Eddie, Caroline and Surfer Guys
"Shut Down" – Bobby, Caroline, Dave, Eddie and Surfer Guys
"Be True to Your School" – Country Dude and Chili Dog Kids
"Car Crazy Cutie" – Bobby, Dave, Eddie and Surfer Guys
"The Warmth of the Sun" – Marcella, Caroline and Giggles Girls
"Pet Sounds" – Instrumental
"Surfin' U.S.A." – Jan, Dean and Beach Kids
"Dance, Dance, Dance" – Caroline, Jan and Beach Kids

Act two
"California Girls" – Jan, Dean and Beach Kids
"Help Me, Rhonda" – Eddie, Bobby, Dave and Beach Guys
"Stoked" – Beach Guys
"Surfer Girl" – Bobby and Beach Guys
"Darlin'" – Jan, Caroline and Beach Kids
"Your Imagination" – Caroline and Marcella
"Caroline, No" – Bobby
"All Summer Long" – Beach Kids
"I Just Wasn't Made for These Times" – Dave, Bobby and Eddie
"Wouldn't It Be Nice (Reprise)" – Eddie, Marcella and Surfer Guys
"Sail On, Sailor" – Eddie, Dean and Beach Kids
"Sloop John B" – Jan, Dave and Beach Kids
"Friends" – Surfer Guys
"Good Vibrations" – Bobby and Company
"God Only Knows" – Bobby, Caroline and Company
"Finale" – The Company

Critical reception
Good Vibrations received many harshly mixed reviews that condemned its plot as being superficial, predictable and bland, contrived around incorporating as many Beach Boys' songs as possible.  Since the songs were not tailor-made for the musical, critics complained that songs did little to progress the plot or give insight into the characters.  Therefore, despite an energetic cast and a soulful score of favorite tunes, the general verdict was that Good Vibrations made for a nice concert but a poor example of true musical theatre.

References

2005 musicals
Broadway musicals
Jukebox musicals
Musical tributes to the Beach Boys